Sea scorpion may refer to:

 Eurypterids, members of the extinct order Eurypterida
 Some members of the fish family Cottidae, including the long-spined sea scorpion and short-spined sea scorpion (also known as father lasher)

See also
 Nepidae - an insect, commonly known as a "water scorpion"

Animal common name disambiguation pages